Helicina platychila is a species of tropical land snail with an operculum, a terrestrial gastropod mollusk in the family Helicinidae.

The description of Helicina epistilia Guppy, 1868 matches this species, and these names are therefore considered synonyms.

Shell description 
As in many helicinid species, the shell of Helicina platychila can be yellow, to red, to brown in colour.

Distribution
This species lives in Guadeloupe, Dominica and in Martinique.

The type locality is Guadeloupe.

Ecology 
Helicina platychila is fairly common arboreally on branches and leaf surfaces, and between detritus and leaves on the ground, occasionally together with Helicina guppyi in Dominica.

References
This article incorporates CC-BY-3.0 text from the reference.

Helicinidae
Gastropods described in 1824